Friday the 13th is considered an unlucky day in Western superstition. It occurs when the 13th day of the month in the Gregorian calendar falls on a Friday, which happens at least once every year but can occur up to three times in the same year. For example, 2015 had a Friday the 13th in February, March, and November; 2017 through 2020 had two Friday the 13ths; 2016, 2021 and 2022 had just one Friday the 13th; 2023 and 2024 have two Friday the 13ths.

A month has a Friday the 13th if and only if it begins on a Sunday.

History

Unluckiness of "13" 

According to folklore historian Donald Dossey, the unlucky nature of the number "13" originated with a Norse myth about 12 gods having a dinner party in Valhalla. The trickster god Loki, who was not invited, arrived as the 13th guest, and arranged for Höðr to shoot Balder with a mistletoe-tipped arrow. Dossey: "Balder died, and the whole Earth got dark. The whole Earth mourned. It was a bad, unlucky day." This major event in Norse mythology caused the number 13 to be considered unlucky.

Christian associations 

The superstition seems to relate to various things, like the story of Jesus' last supper and crucifixion in which there were 13 individuals present in the Upper Room on the 13th of Nisan Maundy Thursday, the night before his death on Good Friday.

In conjunction with Friday 
While there is evidence of both Friday and the number 13 being considered unlucky, there is no record of the two items being referred to as especially unlucky in conjunction before the 19th century.

19th century 

In France, Friday 13th might have been associated with misfortune as early as the first half of the 19th century. A character in the 1834 play Les Finesses des Gribouilles states, "I was born on a Friday, December 13th, 1813 from which come all of my misfortunes".

An early documented reference in English occurs in H. S. Edwards' biography of Gioachino Rossini, who died on Friday 13th of November 1868:
"Rossini was surrounded to the last by admiring friends; and if it be true that, like so many Italians, he regarded Fridays as an unlucky day and thirteen as an unlucky number, it is remarkable that on Friday 13th of November he passed away."

Dissemination 
It is possible that the publication in 1907 of T. W. Lawson's popular novel Friday, the Thirteenth,
contributed to popularizing the superstition. In the novel, an unscrupulous broker takes advantage of the superstition to create a Wall Street panic on a Friday the 13th.

Similar dates 
Similar dates are prevalent in many cultures, although it is unclear whether these similarities are in any way historically connected or only coincidental.

Tuesday the 13th in Hispanic and Greek culture 
In Spanish-speaking countries, instead of Friday, Tuesday the 13th (martes trece) is considered a day of bad luck.

The Greeks also consider Tuesday (and especially the 13th) an unlucky day. Tuesday is considered dominated by the influence of Ares, the god of war (or Mars, the Roman equivalent). The fall of Constantinople to the Fourth Crusade occurred on Tuesday 13 April 1204, and the Fall of Constantinople to the Ottomans happened on Tuesday 29 May 1453, events that strengthen the superstition about Tuesday. In addition, in Greek the name of the day is Triti (Τρίτη) meaning the third (day of the week), adding weight to the superstition, since bad luck is said to "come in threes".

There is a Tuesday the 13th in months that begin on a Thursday.

Friday the 17th in Italy

In Italian popular culture, Friday the 17th (and not the 13th) is considered a bad luck day.
The origin of this belief could be traced in the writing of the number 17, in Roman numerals: XVII. By shuffling the digits of the number one can easily get the word VIXI ("I have lived", implying death at present), an omen of bad luck.
In fact, in Italy, 13 is generally considered a lucky number. However, due to Americanization, young people consider Friday the 13th unlucky as well.

The 2000 parody film Shriek if You Know What I Did Last Friday the Thirteenth was released in Italy with the title Shriek – Hai impegni per venerdì 17? ("Shriek – Do You Have Something to Do on Friday the 17th?").

There is a Friday the 17th in months starting on Wednesday.

Social impact 
According to the Stress Management Center and Phobia Institute in Asheville, North Carolina, an estimated 17–21 million people in the United States are affected by a fear of this day, making it the most feared day and date in history. Some people are so paralyzed by fear that they avoid their normal routines in doing business, taking flights or even getting out of bed. It's been estimated that US$800–900 million is lost in business on this day.
Despite this, representatives for both Delta Air Lines and Continental Airlines (the latter now merged into United Airlines) have stated that their airlines do not suffer from any noticeable drop in travel on those Fridays.

In Finland, a consortium of governmental and nongovernmental organizations led by the Ministry of Social Affairs and Health promotes the National Accident Day (kansallinen tapaturmapäivä) to raise awareness about automotive safety, which always falls on a Friday the 13th.
The event is coordinated by the Finnish Red Cross and has been held since 1995.

Rate of accidents 
A study by Scanlon, Luben, Scanlon, & Singleton (1993)
attracted attention from popular science literature,
as it concluded that "the risk of hospital admission as a result of a transport accident may be increased by as much as 52 percent on the 13th";
however, the authors clearly state that "the numbers of admissions from accidents are too small to allow meaningful analysis".
Subsequent studies have disproved any correlation between Friday the 13th and the rate of accidents.

On 12 June 2008 the Dutch Centre for Insurance Statistics stated to the contrary, that "fewer accidents and reports of fire and theft occur when the 13th of the month falls on a Friday than on other Fridays, because people are preventatively more careful or just stay home. Statistically speaking, driving is slightly safer on Friday the 13th, at least in the Netherlands; in the last two years, Dutch insurers received reports of an average 7,800 traffic accidents each Friday; but the average figure when the 13th fell on a Friday was just 7,500."

Occurrence

Distribution 
Each 400 year Gregorian solar cycle contains 146,097 days (with 97 leap days) or exactly 20,871 weeks. Each cycle contains the same pattern of days of the week and therefore the same pattern of Fridays that are on the 13th. The 13th day of the month is slightly more likely to be a Friday than any other day of the week.

{| class=wikitable style="margin-left: auto; margin-right: auto; border: none;"
|+ Distribution of the 13th day per weekday over 4,800 months (400 years)
|- style="vertical-align:center; text-align:center"
! Day of the week
! Monday || Tuesday || Wednesday || Thursday || Friday || Saturday || Sunday
|- style="text-align:center;"
! Occurrences
| 685 || 685 || 687 || 684 || 688 || 684 || 687
|}

Any month that starts on a Sunday contains a Friday the 13th, and there is at least one Friday the 13th in every calendar year. 
The months with a Friday the 13th are determined by the Dominical letter (G, F, GF, etc.) of the year. Years which begin on the same day of the week and are of the same type (i.e. common year or leap year), will have a Friday the 13th in the same months.

This sequence, given here for 1900–2099, follows a 28-year cycle from 1 March 1900 to 28 February 2100:

Frequency 
Although there is always at least one Friday the 13th per calendar year, it can be as long as 14 months between two Friday the 13ths. The longest period that occurs without a Friday the 13th is 14 months, either from July to September the following year being a common year starting on Tuesday (F) (e.g. 2001–02, 2012–13 and 2018–19), or from August to October the following year being a leap year starting on Saturday (BA) (e.g. 1999–2000 and 2027–28). The shortest period that occurs with a Friday the 13th is just one month, from February to March in a common year starting on Thursday (D) (e.g. 2009, 2015 and 2026).

On average, there is a Friday the 13th once every 212.35 days. Friday the 13ths occurs with an average frequency of 1.7218 per year or about 3477 since the year 1 CE.

Frequency within a single year 
There can be no more than three Friday the 13ths in a single calendar year; either in February, March, and November in a common year starting on Thursday (such as 2009, 2015, or 2026) (D), or January, April, and July in a leap year starting on Sunday (such as 1984, 2012, or 2040) (AG).

In the 2000s, there were three Friday the 13ths in 2009, and two Friday the 13ths in 2001, 2002, 2006, and 2007. In the 2010s, there were three Friday the 13ths in 2012 and 2015, and two in 2013, 2017, 2018, and 2019. In the 2020s, there were two Friday the 13ths in 2020. There will also be three Friday the 13ths in 2026, and two in 2023, 2024, and 2029. The remaining years all have at least one Friday the 13th.

For the details see the table below; this table is for the Gregorian calendar and / for :

{| class="wikitable" style="margin-left: auto; margin-right: auto; border: none;"
|- style="vertical-align:center; text-align:center"
! Yearmodulo 28 ||  || 1700 2100 || 1800 2200 || 1900 2300 || Yearmodulo 28
|-
|  06  17 23 || Jan Oct ||  Aug || Jun ||  Apr Jul ||  06  17 23
|-
| 01 07  18  ||  Apr Jul || May || Feb Mar Nov || Sep Dec || 01 07  18 
|-
| 02  13 19  || Sep Dec || Jan Oct ||  Aug || Jun || 02  13 19 
|-
| 03  14  25 || Jun ||  Apr Jul || May || Feb Mar Nov || 03  14  25
|-
|  09 15  26 || Feb Mar Nov || Sep Dec || Jan Oct ||  Aug ||  09 15  26
|-
|  10  21 27 ||  Aug || Jun ||  Apr Jul || May ||  10  21 27
|-
| 05 11  22  || May || Feb Mar Nov || Sep Dec || Jan Oct || 05 11  22 
|}

See also
 13 (number)
 Solar cycle (calendar)
 St. Brice's Day massacre
 Tycho Brahe days

Footnotes

References

External links

 

  — multi-year calendar with Fri 13s marked

  — article examines S&P 500 index performance on Fri 13s

  — examines All Ordinaries Index ("All Ords") for 1 Jan 1985 – 12 Jan 1985

 
Luck
Superstitions about numbers
Superstitions of Europe
Superstitions of the Americas
Triskaidekaphobia
Unofficial observances